Live at El Matador is a live performance album by pianist Vince Guaraldi and guitarist Bola Sete, released in October 1966 by Fantasy Records. It is their third and final recorded collaboration as well as Guaraldi's last release for Fantasy.

In 2000, it was issued on CD coupled with Vince Guaraldi, Bola Sete and Friends (1964) as Vince & Bola.

Background
Live at El Matador is a condensed version of a live performance that Guaraldi and Sete regularly presented at this point in their collaboration. Guaraldi and his trio performed their set first, followed by a solo performance from Sete, and then concluded with Guaraldi's trio rejoining Sete for a joint finale. Live at El Matador contains the first and third segments of a performance, excising Sete's solo set. The original vinyl release contained Guaraldi's opening set on Side One and the concluding Guaraldi/Sete set on Side Two.

Despite Live at El Matador being a live album, Fantasy Record engineers faded several selections rather than letting them naturally conclude with audience applause. Guaraldi historian and author Derrick Bang commented that this "results in some jarringly abrupt fades, most disturbingly on 'I'm a Loser'."

Track listing

Personnel 
Credits adapted from rear cover of original 1966 vinyl release.
 Bola Sete – guitar 

Vince Guaraldi Trio
 Vince Guaraldi – piano
 Tom Beeson – double bass
 Lee Charlton – drums

Additional
 Wally Heider – mastering
 Fred Schill – design
 James Easton – sound engineer
 Jack Engelman – liner notes

Release history

References

External links 
 

1966 live albums
Collaborative albums
Fantasy Records albums
Vince Guaraldi albums
Vince Guaraldi live albums
Bola Sete live albums